Kord Shul (also Romanized as Kord Shūl; also known as Gerd Shūl and Kurd Shūl) is a village in Fathabad Rural District, in the Central District of Qir and Karzin County, Fars Province, Iran. At the 2006 census, its population was 197, in 40 families. The majority of the population of Kord Shul are from Kordshuli tribe.

References 

Populated places in Qir and Karzin County